A list of books and essays about Andrei Tarkovsky :

Bibliography
Tarkovsky